The 2014 UCLA Bruins football team represented the University of California, Los Angeles in the 2014 NCAA Division I FBS football season. The team was coached by third-year head coach Jim L. Mora and played its home games at the Rose Bowl in Pasadena, California. They were members of the South Division of the Pac-12 Conference. The team was featured in the Pac-12 Network's The Drive program.

The Bruins were ranked No. 7 in preseason national polls, and were expected to contend for not only one of the four berths in the inaugural College Football Playoff, but also the national championship. They started the season 4–0, often struggling, before suffering consecutive home losses to the Utah Utes and Oregon Ducks. After dropping out of the polls, they re-emerged as playoff contenders with five straight wins. However, UCLA lost their final home game to unranked Stanford, costing them the South Division title, a spot in the Pac-12 Championship, and any remaining shot at a CFP berth. 

They concluded their season in the 2015 Alamo Bowl with a win over the Kansas State Wildcats, 40–35, and a 10-win season. It was the ninth 10-win season in school history, and just the third time in their history that UCLA had won 10 games in consecutive seasons. On the season, the Bruins outscored their opponents by a combined total of 435 to 365. They also had the most difficult strength of schedule of any team in the FBS that year.

Previous season

Led by quarterback Brett Hundley, offensive guard Xavier Su'a-Filo, outside linebacker Anthony Barr, and inside linebacker Jordan Zumwalt, the Bruins were 10–3 and winners of the Sun Bowl over Virginia Tech, 42–12.

Recruiting
On February 5, 2014, Coach Mora announced that nineteen high school seniors and one transfer graduate student have signed national letters-of-intent, grants-in-aid and/or offers of admission to UCLA.

Roster

Pre-season
 Tuesday, March 11, 2014 – Pro Day
 Tuesday, April 1 to Saturday, April 26, 2014 – Spring football 
 Saturday, April 26, 2014 – Spring Football Game at StubHub Center, in Carson, California 5:00 p.m., on Pac-12 Network

Schedule

Game summaries

Virginia
UCLA, playing for the first time in the Commonwealth of Virginia, is 17–13 all-time versus current members of the ACC. UCLA defeated ACC's Virginia Tech in the 2013 Sun Bowl, 42–12.

Seventh-ranked UCLA defeated the Virginia Cavaliers 28–20 after scoring three defensive touchdowns in the second quarter.  Hundley, considered among the nation's leading quarterbacks, ran for a critical touchdown in the third quarter for the Bruins' only touchdown on offense. UCLA's defense had not recorded three touchdowns since 1986.

The Bruins played without two starters on the offensive line, and Virginia's defense disrupted Hundley throughout the game, sacking him five times. However, the Bruins led 21–3 after their third defensive score, forcing Virginia to replace starting quarterback Greyson Lambert with Matt Johns. The Cavaliers, who were just 2–10 a year earlier, pulled to within 21–17 before Hundley capped a 66-yard drive late in the third quarter with a 6-yard touchdown run after overpowering safety Quin Blanding at the three-yard line. Virginia was deep inside UCLA territory late in the game when Myles Jack disrupted a John's pass on fourth-and-8 to end the drive.

Ishmael Adams returned a tipped Lambert pass 20 yards for the Bruins first score. Randall Goforth returned a fumble 75 yards for another touchdown, and Eric Kendricks returned another Lambert interception 37 yards for a score.

Memphis
Honorary captain – UCLA will honor Sam Storey '34, Kenny Washington '41 and Woody Strode '41 at this week’s game. Washington and Strode are featured in the film Forgotten Four: The Integration of Pro Football, which is the story of four African Americans who courageously broke the color barrier in professional football.

UCLA's offense rebounded from the previous week to gain 540 yards as the Bruins won 42–35 over the Memphis Tigers in another tougher-than-expected game. Hundley threw a 33-yard touchdown to Thomas Duarte for the go-ahead score with 10:52 remaining, and the UCLA defense stopped three drives from the Tigers to secure their fourth straight win in a home opener.  Hundley passed for 396 yards and three touchdowns in the game.

While their offense looked fine, UCLA's defense surrendered 469 yards. Memphis quarterback Paxton Lynch threw for 305 yards and a touchdown. UCLA twice led by 14 points, and led 35–21 after three quarters, but the Tigers tied the score at 35 with 13 minutes left in the fourth when Fritz Etienne returned a Hundley interception 17 yards for a touchdown. Duarte's game-winning catch was his second touchdown of the game. Paul Perkins rushed for two touchdowns in the game, and Jack spent time as a running back, running for his first touchdown of the season. The linebacker Jack was both the Pac-12's offensive and defensive newcomer of the year the prior season.

Memphis had won just 12 games over the prior five seasons. They drove the ball to the UCLA 41-yard line when the game clock expired. "We're happy to get the win, but we're certainly not happy to be playing the way we're playing," UCLA coach Jim Mora said.

Texas (Advocare Cowboys Showdown)

Backup quarterback Jerry Neuheisel threw a game-winning 33-yard touchdown pass to Jordan Payton with three minutes remaining in the game to defeat the Texas Longhorns 20–17. Neuheisel threw two touchdowns in the game after starting quarterback Hundley injured his left elbow in the first quarter. The third-year sophomore and son of former UCLA coach Rick Neuheisel was carried off the field by teammates after the game.

Hundley was hurt on UCLA's second possession of the game with 4:29 remaining in the first quarter when he landed awkwardly after reaching down at the Bruins 35 while being tackled after an 11-yard run to convert a third-and-nine. UCLA scored its first TD on the opening drive of the second half, going 75 yards on seven plays. Perkins began the drive with a 58-yard run, which led to the Neuheisel's game-tying 3-yard pass to Nate Iese. Texas went ahead with 5:13 left in the game when quarterback Tyrone Swoopes connected with John Harris on an 8-yard TD pass. The Longhorns then recovered a fumble, but the UCLA defense forced a punt after three plays. UCLA's Adams returned the kick 58 yards, which set up Neuheisel's game-winning toss on the following play.

Neuheisel completed 23 of 30 passes for 178 yards. Perkins added 126 yards on 24 carries for the Bruins, and caught five passes for 69 yards. UCLA kicker Ka'imi Fairbairn made a 47-yard field goal to give UCLA an early 3–0 lead. He had struggled in his career from long range—the kick made him eight of 16 from 40 or more yards in his career. UCLA won the coin toss before the game and elected to differ, but Texas also chose to kickoff in the second half, which allowed the Bruins to receive both halves' opening kickoff.

Arizona State

After winning their first three games against non-ranked teams by a combined 18 points, UCLA routed the No. 15 Arizona State Sun Devils 62–27. Hundley returned from an arm injury the prior week to complete 18 of 23 passes for 355 yards and four touchdowns, and Adams scored two touchdowns with a 95-yard interception return and a 100-yard kickoff return. The game was a matchup of the past two Pac-12 South champions.

Hundley's availability for the game was a game-time decision by Mora.  Arizona State held a 17–6 lead before the Bruins scored 28 unanswered points. Eldridge Massington turned a short pass into an 80-yard touchdown to cut the deficit to 17–13.  The Sun Devils were driving for a tying or go-ahead score before halftime when Adams returned an interception for a 27–17 lead. Hundley opened the second half with an 80-yard touchdown pass to Payton on the first play.

Hundley also ran for 72 yards, including the Bruins' final touchdown. UCLA finished with 62 points, the most ever scored in the 55-year-history of Sun Devil Stadium. They had 580 total yards on offense, while their defense forced four turnovers that led to 17 Bruins points.  However, Arizona State gained 626 yards on 105 plays. Sun Devils quarterback Mike Bercovici, who replaced injured starter Taylor Kelly, passed for 488 yards and three touchdowns in his first start while setting school records in completions (42) and attempts (68).

Utah

The Utah Utes' Andy Phillips kicked a game-winning 29-yard field goal with 34 seconds left in the game for a 30–28 upset over No. 8 UCLA. The Utes hung on as Fairbairn missed two field goal attempts of 55 and 50 yards, respectively, with no time remaining. Hundley was sacked 10 times, and the Bruins trailed for most of the game. Their offense gained 406 yards, but could not develop any consistency. UCLA was the fifth team in the top eight of the AP Poll to lose during the week, the first time in the poll's history since it began in 1936.

Utah led 7–0 after Tevin Carter intercepted a Hundley screen pass intended for Perkins, and returned it for a 27-yard touchdown with 5:51 remaining in the first quarter. Kendal Thompson replaced Utah starting quarterback Travis Wilson after two offensive series. He completed all seven of his passes in the first half, and his running helped the Utes to a 17–7 lead at halftime. Hundley struggled through the first three quarters with just 21 passes for 105 yards and no touchdowns, as the Bruins were playing without left guard Alex Redmond. The quarterback rallied UCLA with long TD passes of  93 yards to Devin Fuller and 40 yards to Massington, and the Bruins led 28–27 with five minutes remaining. However, Utah ran 4:16 off the clock before Phillips' kick with a 10-play, 63-yard drive behind the rushing of Thompson and Devontae Booker, who had 40 yards on the drive and 156 yards in the game. Hundley then drove UCLA to the Utah 37, when Fairbairn initially missed a 55-yard attempt. However, the Utes were penalized for running into the kicker, providing Fairbairn a chance at a 50-yard field goal, which missed just wide right.

Hundley threw for 269 yards, and Perkins ran for 99, including UCLA's first touchdown in the second quarter. Thompson passed for 95 yards and ran for 83 for the Utes. Utah ran for 242 of their 342 total yards. Hundey's 93-yard strike to Fuller was the second-longest play from scrimmage in Bruins history. With 107 sacks in 32 career games, Hundley's sack total was the highest among active Football Bowl Subdivision quarterbacks.

Oregon

The Bruins suffered back-to-back defeats after losing 42–30 to the Oregon Ducks. UCLA scored three touchdowns in the fourth quarter after Oregon had built a 42–10 lead. It was their seventh consecutive loss to the Ducks, and likely dropped the Bruins out of the national title race. UCLA allowed 468 yards, including 258 rushing, and Ducks quarterback Marcus Mariota passed for two touchdown and ran for two others.

Oregon went ahead 8–0 after Hundley lost a fumble after being sacked in the first quarter, leading to a Mariota 13-yard TD run and a successful two-point conversion. UCLA went on an 83-yard drive, but had to settle for a field goal. The Ducks' second TD came on a 21-yard screen pass from Mariota to Thomas Tyner, prompting an animated sideline exchange between Mora and defensive coordinator Jeff Ulbrich. A 16-yard scoring run by Hundley with 3 seconds left in the first half cut the Ducks lead to 21–10.  On Oregon's first possession of the second half, Mariota dropped the ball, but it bounced back to him and he ran for a 23-yard TD.  Shortly thereafter, a Hundley interception was returned to the UCLA 10, setting up the first of Royce Freeman's two touchdown runs for a 35–10 lead. The Ducks expanded the margin to 42–10 in the opening minute of the final quarter with another score by Freeman.

UCLA's offense gained 553 yards. Perkins ran for 187 yards, and Hundley passed for 216 yards with two touchdowns passing and one running. Payton caught two fourth-quarter TDs. Mariota completed 17 of 27 passes for 210 yards, and added 75 yards rushing; the Bruins did not sack him after he suffered 12 in his previous two games. Freeman also ran for 121 yards for the Ducks.

California

Fairbairn gave the Bruins the lead with a field goal with 3:40 left in the game, and defensive back Marcus Rios made a game-saving interception with 51 seconds remaining for a 36–34 win over the California Golden Bears. The win was UCLA's first at Cal since 1998, ending a seven-game losing streak at Memorial Stadium. Hundley threw for 330 yards and two touchdowns and ran for another score, but lost a fumble and threw an interception. The Golden Bears converted the Bruins' three turnovers into 21 points.

UCLA moved the ball against Cal's defense, gaining 567 yards and punting just three times on 15 possessions. They led 24–14 at the half, with Cal staying close due to fumbles by Hundley and Perkins. The Bears held UCLA on fourth-and-inches at midfield to start the third quarter, and scored a touchdown three plays later to pull closer at 24–21. The Bruins were leading 33–28 in the fourth with the ball in Bears' territory when Hundley threw behind receiver Jordan Payton and was intercepted by Cameron Walker, who returned the ball to the UCLA 32. Cal's Jared Goff followed with a 23-yard TD to Kenny Lawler with seven minutes to go for a 34–33 lead. The Bruins responded with Hundley leading a drive that led to Fairbairn's third field goal, a 26-yarder to recapture the lead, 36–34. The Bears comeback ended when Goff's deep sideline pass was picked off by Rios at the UCLA 2.

Hundley had 424 yards of total offense, and Perkins had 2 TD catches. Goff had 303 passing yards and two touchdowns for the Bears. Rios entered the game after cornerback Fabian Moreau left with an injury.

Colorado

The Bruins won 40–37 over the Colorado Buffaloes in double overtime after Hundley ran 8 yards on the winning touchdown. UCLA  (6–2 overall, 3–2 in the Pac-12) had surrendered a 17-point lead in the fourth quarter after Buffaloes kicker Will Oliver tied the game with a 35-yard field goal with 36 seconds left in regulation. Colorado (2–6, 0–5) had lost 28 of 32 conference games since they joined the Pac-12 in 2011.

On the Bruins' first play, Perkins ran for a 92-yard touchdown for the second-longest run in school history, and the team jumped to a 17–0 first-quarter lead. Leading 24–7, UCLA had back-to-back interceptions by Adams and Jack erased by penalties, extending a touchdown drive for Colorado that made it 24–14.  Hundley fumbled the ball deep in Bruins territory and the Buffaloes were at the UCLA 4 with 24 seconds left in the first half. However, Colorado mismanaged the clock and time expired without another play. After a 3-yard touchdown run by Jack, the Bruins ended the third quarter ahead 31–14 before Colorado scored 17 unanswered points. The teams exchanged field goals in the first overtime, and Oliver put the Buffaloes ahead 37–34 with another kick in the second overtime. However, Hundley took over with a 17-yard run followed by a run through a huge hole for his game-winning score.

Perkins finished with 180 yards rushing and two touchdowns. Hundley added 110 on the ground; he was not as sharp passing, missing receivers throughout the game while completing 24 of 39 for 200 yards and one touchdown. UCLA gained 509 yards on offense, rushing for 309. Colorado had 500 yards, 233 on the ground.

Arizona

UCLA won 17–7 over the No. 14 Arizona Wildcats, who were held to 255 yards in total offense—287 below their season average. Hundley produced 320 yards in total offense with 189 yards passing and 131 rushing. The win kept the Bruins tied for second place in the South Division of the Pac-12 behind Arizona State, and they remained in contention for the conference championship game.

The Wildcats took a 7–0 lead on their opening drive of the game, aided by two 15-yard penalties by Jack that negated third-down stops by the Bruins. Anu Solomon hit Cayleb Jones for a 14-yard score, the only TD of the first half. Fairbairn made a 34-yard field goal in the second quarter after  UCLA failed to score from the Arizona 1. Earlier in the game, he missed a field goal attempt, the first time the Bruins failed to score inside the red zone during the season after 30 tries. UCLA took the lead after a 5-yard run by Perkins capped 12-play drive. On their next possession, Hundley hit Payton in stride for a 70-yard score down the UCLA sideline.

Hundley ran for 100 yards for the second consecutive game. Perkins rushed for 78 yards, and became the 13th Bruin with a 1,000 yard rushing season. UCLA committed 11 penalties for 118 yards, including five holding penalties that impeded the offense. Arizona's Solomon was just 18-for-48 passing for 175 yards.

Washington

UCLA defeated the Washington Huskies 44–30 after scoring a season-high 31 points in the first half. Hundley threw two touchdown passes and become the Bruins' career leader, and he also ran for two other touchdowns.

Hundley threw his 69th career TD, passing Cade McNown for the school record, on a 57-yard pass to Kenneth Walker III that gave the Bruins a 14–0 lead in the first quarter. Washington pulled to within 14–10, before UCLA scored on its last three possessions of the half—highlighted by a 28-yard TD run by Jack—to lead 31–10 at halftime. The Huskies did not manage to get closer than 14 points the rest of the game. Mora called it "probably as complete a game we have played from start to finish this year."

Hundley was 29-of-36 for 302 yards, and Perkins rushed for 98. UCLA finished the season 6–0 on the road, and won their ninth consecutive game away from the Rose Bowl.

USC

The Bruins defeated the No. 24 USC Trojans 38–20 for their third-straight victory over their crosstown rivals. The win put the Bruins in position to capture the Pac-12 South title with a victory the following week. Brett Hundley passed for 326 yards and three touchdowns and ran for another TD, while UCLA's defense held the Trojans to only 200 yards and seven points through the first three quarters. Hundley remained undefeated in three career starts against USC, giving the Bruins their first three-game winning streak in the series since 1998. The margin of victory was UCLA's largest over USC since a 45–25 win in 1986.

USC led 7–0 three minutes into the game after Anthony Sarao intercepted Hundley and returned it 17 yards for a touchdown. After the Trojans' Nelson Agholor fumbled a punt at the USC 10, a wide-open Devin Lucien caught a touchdown to even the score from the Bruins. UCLA scored again 39 seconds later when Duarte turned a mid-range pass from Hundley into a 57-yard TD. After USC tied the game at 14, Eric Kendricks intercepted a tipped pass from Cody Kessler, which Hundley converted into a 68-yard TD drive for a 24–14 lead before the half ended. Paul Perkins scored from 10 yards out to cap an 84-yard drive to start the second half, and Hundley ran 15-yards up the middle midway through the third quarter for the Bruins' final score. With the game in hand for the Bruins, the Trojans gained 91 of their 276 total yards in the game on a meaningless TD drive.

Hundley became UCLA's career leader in total offense after passing Cade McNown's record of 11,285. Perkins ran 24 times for 93 yards to overtake USC's Javorius Allen, who was held to 60 yards, for the conference lead in rushing yards. UCLA scored at least 35 points in three consecutive games against USC for the first time in its rivalry. Under coach Jim Mora and Hundley, UCLA has beaten USC by a combined score of 111–62 over the last three years. The Bruins had a season-high six sacks, and Kessler was limited to 22 of 34 passing for 214 yards.

Stanford

UCLA (9–3, 6–3) lost 31–10 at home to the Stanford Cardinal (7–5, 5-4), who defeated the Bruins for the seventh consecutive time.  UCLA, which had an outside shot at a College Football Playoff berth,  would have clinched the South Division and qualified for the Pac-12 Championship Game with a victory. Hundley was sacked four times while throwing for just 146 yards. The Bruins were shut out for the final 41 minutes of the game.

UCLA led 7–0 after Hundley connected with Duarte for a score on their opening drive. However, Stanford's Kevin Hogan was 14 for 15 for 189 yards and two TDs in the first half to lead the Cardinal to a 21–10 halftime lead. After Stanford scored on their first possession of the second half, they proceeded to control the clock. Stanford outgained UCLA in yardage 436–262 and had possession of the ball for almost 38 minutes. Backup Jerry Neuheisel finished the game after Hundley exited in the middle of the fourth quarter with an injured throwing hand.

UCLA entered the game No. 8 in the College Football Playoff ranking, and could have faced No. 2 Oregon in the conference championship. The Bruins' 10 points were their fewest since being held to 10 by Stanford the prior season.

Kansas State (Alamo Bowl)

UCLA jumped to a large halftime lead and held on for a 40–35 win over the No. 11 Kansas State Wildcats in the Alamo Bowl. Perkins scored on a 67-yard run to give the Bruins a 40–28 lead with just over two minutes left in the game, and he helped recover an onside kick to seal the game after the Wildcats final score.  He finished with a career-high 194 yards with two touchdowns, and was named the bowl's offensive most valuable player (MVP). UCLA ran for 331 yards, including 96 by Hundley. After making a team-high 10 tackles, including three for a loss, Kendricks was voted the game's defensive MVP. The win earned UCLA their second straight 10–3 season, and their first consecutive bowl victories since winning eight in a row from 1983 through 1991.

Hundley ran for two touchdowns in the first quarter, when he also completed nine of 11 passes for 85 yards. The Bruins led 31–6 at the half after holding Kansas State to just 87 total yards. However, the Wildcats rallied to score 15 straight points and controlled the ball for almost 13 minutes in the third quarter. They pulled to within 34–28 after a touchdown with five minutes remaining.  The scoring drive was extended by two penalties by UCLA, who had 15 for an Alamo Bowl record 128 yards.  UCLA responded with Perkins' touchdown run on a second-and-13 play, extending the lead to 40–28. The Wildcats came as close as 40–35 with 1:21 remaining after Tyler Lockett caught a 29-yard touchdown pass from Jake Waters, but the comeback ended after their failed onside attempt.

Hundley accounted for three touchdowns and threw for 136 yards, but completed only three of 13 passes after the first quarter. It was his 29th career win, one behind school-leader McNown. The UCLA defense had a season-high seven sacks after entering the contest averaging just 1.8 (22 in 12 games). Perkins finished the season as the Pac-12 rushing leader with 1,575 yards. Kendricks led the Football Bowl Subdivision with 149 solo tackles, and set the UCLA record for career tackles with 481, breaking the previous mark of 468 set by Jerry Robinson (1976–1978). Kansas State's Lockett had an Alamo Bowl record 13 receptions for 164 yards, and tied the bowl record with two TD receptions. His 249 all-purpose yards were also a bowl record. Waters was 31-of-48 passing for 338 yards, but was intercepted twice and lost a fumble.

Coaches
 Jim L. Mora, Head coach
 Noel Mazzone, Offensive coordinator/Quarterbacks
 Adrian Klemm, Associate head coach/Running game coordinator/Offensive line
 Jeff Ulbrich, Defensive coordinator
 Kennedy Polamalu, Running backs
 Mike Tuiasosopo, Special teams, Linebackers
 Demetrice Martin, Assistant head coach/Passing game coordinator/Defensive backs
 Eric Yarber, Wide receivers
 Angus McClure, Defensive line/Recruiting coordinator
 Taylor Mazzone, Quarterbacks coach
 Sal Alosi, Coordinator of strength & conditioning

Rankings

Awards and honors
 September 1, 2014 – Linebacker Eric Kendricks named the Walter Camp National Player of the Week and Pac-12 Defensive Player of the week. Kendricks was also named the Nagurski Trophy National Defensive Player of the Week and the Lott IMPACT Trophy Player of the Week.
 September 15, 2014 – Quarterback Jerry Neuheisel and defensive back Ishmael Adams were named offensive and special teams Pac-12 Players of the Week respectively.
September 29, 2014 – Brett Hundley and Ishmael Adams were named offensive and special teams Pac-12 Players of the Week; Adams was also named to the Paul Hornung Award Honor Roll and was the Athlon Sports National Defensive Player of the Week.
September 30, 2014 – Eric Kendricks was named the Lott Impact Player of the Week.
 November 10, 2014 – Ka'imi Fairbairn was named to the Pac-12 Conference Special Teams Player of the Week; Brett Hundley has been named a finalist for the Johnny Unitas Golden Arm Award; Myles Jack was named to the Paul Hornung Award Honor Roll after his performance this week.
 November 12, 2014 – Linebacker Eric Kendricks was named a semi-finalist for the Lott IMPACT Trophy.
 December 24, 2014 – Linebacker Eric Kendricks was named Pac-12 Defensive Player of the Week.
 November 25, 2014 – Jim Mora was named Bobby Dodd Trophy Coach of the Week.

Butkus Award
 Linebacker Eric Kendricks
Lott IMPACT Trophy
 Eric Kendricks

Pac-12 All-Conference Teams: 

 First team – Sophomore defensive back Ishmael Adams
 Second team – Junior QB Brett Hundley, Junior C Jake Brendel, Sophomore DL Kenny Clark, Senior DL Owamagbe Odighizuwa, Senior LB Eric Kendricks, Sophomore LB Myles Jack, Senior DB Anthony Jefferson, Junior DB Fabian Moreau.
 Honorable mention – Sophomore OL Caleb Benenoch, Sophomore WR Thomas Duarte, Senior LB Ryan Hofmeister (special teams), Junior WR Jordan Payton, Sophomore RB Paul Perkins, Sophomore OL Alex Redmond, Sophomore OL Scott Quessenberry, Sophomore DL Eddie Vanderdoes, Freshman DB Jaleel Wadood.

CoSIDA Academic All-District Football Team - District 8
 First team – OL Jake Brendel

Pac-12 All-Academic teams: 
 First team – Redshirt junior center Jake Brendel (third straight season)
 Second team – Redshirt senior linebacker Eric Kendricks
 Honorable mention – Linebacker Ryan Hofmeister, fullback Taylor Lagace, long snapper Christopher Longo, quarterback/holder Jerry Neuheisel, defensive lineman Owa Odighizuwa, defensive back/special teams Jalen Ortiz, offensive lineman Scott Quessenberry.

Notes
 December 2, 2013 – Running backs coach Steve Broussard was replaced by Kennedy Polamalu
 January 18, 2014 – Defensive coordinator Lou Spanos left the team to join the Tennessee Titans as linebackers coach
 February 5, 2014 – National Signing Day, first day when high school students can sign a NLI with UCLA
 November 22, 2014 – First time UCLA has had three home crowds of 80,000-plus in a single season at the Rose Bowl; wide receiver Sam Handler was standing firmly at midfield to prevent USC band's drum major from stabbing the UCLA logo; UCLA has won nine games for the third straight season, the first time in school history it has won nine in three consecutive years; The Bruins scored at least 35 points for the third straight game against USC, the first time they have accomplished that feat.
 November 28, 2014 – Retirement of Troy Aikman's No. 8 football jersey
 January 12, 2015 – Paul Perkins was named to the Top-10 Postseason Rushing Performance Leaders list for 2014 (20 rushes for 194 yards, 9.7 yards/carry, 2 Touchdowns, 67 yards was the longest for a touchdown).

References

External links

 2014 UCLA Bruins Stats at Sports-Reference.com

UCLA
UCLA Bruins football seasons
Alamo Bowl champion seasons
UCLA Bruins football